Ilya Andreyevich Khrzhanovsky (born 11 August 1975) is a Russian-born film director, screenwriter, film producer and member of the European Film Academy. 
His father Andrei Khrzhanovsky (b. 1939) is one of the top Russian animation directors, and his mother Mariya Neyman, a philologist and script editor. He is the grandson of artist and actor  (1905—1987).

In 2006 Khrzhanovsky launched the DAU project and has since been producing and directing films and other products for it.

Since 2007 Khrzhanovsky has permanently resided outside of Russia, in Germany, Ukraine and the United Kingdom. In March 2014 he signed the open letter “We are with you!” issued by the Russian Film Union KinoSoyuz in support of Ukraine,  and since February 2022 has consistently opposed 
the Russian invasion of Ukraine.

From 2020 to present Khrzhanovsky has worked as the Artistic Director  of the Babyn Yar Holocaust Memorial Center.

As of March 2022, he is in Israel.

Early career
Khrzhanovsky attended the Bonn Academy of Fine Arts (1992–1993)  and the All-Russian State Institute of Cinematography (1998) (VGIK). His directorial debut was the stage production of What I Feel at the Kukart Festival at Peterhof in 1997.

In 1998 he co-directed together with Artyom Mikhalkov the short movie Stop.

Between 1998 and 2002, Khrzhanovsky worked as a director and producer in commercial advertising and created The List of Lovers of the RF for the Russian TNT Channel, a series directed by leading Russian movie directors. In 2003, the project was included in the Berlin International Film Festival programme, as well as other notable Russian and international film festivals.

Phenomen Companies and Paper Soldier
In 2005 Khrzhanovsky co-founded Phenomen Films production company. Phenomen Films developed and produced the critically acclaimed film Paper Soldier (2008) by Aleksei German Jr, that won among others the Silver Lion for Best Direction and Golden Osella for Best Cinematography  at the 65th Venice Film Festival. It was also nominated for European Cinematographer at the European Film Awards. 
 
In 2009 Khrzhanovsky co-founded Phenomen-Ukraine and in 2010 co-founded Phenomen Berlin Filmproduktions GmbH (Germany).

4
Khrzhanovsky directed the film 4 earning him several awards including a Golden Cactus and Tiger Award at the Rotterdam International Film Festival in the Netherlands, Best Director Prize at the Buenos Aires International Festival of Independent Cinema, Grand Jury Prize as Best New Director at the Seattle International Film Festival, Best Film and Best Camera Prize at the Transylvania International Film Festival, Best Director Prize at the Athens International Film Festival and a nomination for the Fassbinder Award. It was included in official programs of more than 50 international film festivals including Venice Film Festival, International Film Festival Rotterdam, Los Angeles Film Festival, Seattle International Film Festival and Tribeca Film Festival. 4 was distributed in the United Kingdom, France, Italy, Netherlands, Belgium, the United States, and also Scandinavian and South Asian countries.

DAU project

DAU is a multidisciplinary project at the intersection of cinema, art and anthropology that premiered in Paris in 2019. DAU was initially conceived as a full length feature film about the life of a genius in troubled times loosely based on the biography of the Soviet physicist and Nobel laureate Lev Landau (nicknamed Dau).

However the filming process transformed into a ‘total performance’ and ‘total installation’   rather than a conventional film shoot.

In 2008 in Kharkiv, Ukraine, the largest shooting location in Europe spanning 12,000m2, named the Institute, was constructed as part of the project. How the location functioned and was used in the filming has suggested parallels between DAU and such projects as Synecdoche, New York and The Truman Show.

The auditions for DAU involved 392,000 non-actors. Around 200-300 non-actors lived on-set at any one time  and around 400 were filmed including scientists, musicians, artists, composers, religious leaders and philosophers, as well as waitresses, cleaners, secret police officers, cooks and hairdressers. 40,000 costume units were produced and purchased during shooting.
 
The architecture, costumes, objects and food created a phantasmagorical reconstruction of the Soviet era of the 1930s to 1960s. The unscripted process was filmed intermittently from October 2009 to November 2011 during which no modern clothes including underwear, no modern sanitary products or any other modern objects or vocabulary were allowed on the set and period costume, make-up and hairstyles were required from everyone including the crew, regardless if shooting was occurring. 
With no script or takes, the characters acted and reacted in the meticulously designed circumstances, sometimes staying on set for months. The process resulted in 700 hours of 35mm film. 13 films of various genres edited from this material were part of the premiere in Paris in 2019. The ‘mother film’ that focused on Dau’s life story with the Institute being just one of the storylines yet to be released. 
 
The genre of the project is defined by critics as ‘sprawling immersive-theater/film/installation’, ‘totalitarian reality show’, ‘not just film or theatre but also of site-specific improvisational performances’  and also as ‘the entire culture of the 1930s-1960s’.

Apart from movie products, the project has additionally manifested in other formats such as books, conferences and complex installations.

Books
Transcribed conversations of characters recorded during the shooting as well as off shooting were available at the Paris premiere.

Thames & Hudson prepared the publication of DAU Document, collecting stills from all footage, on-set photographs shot with Soviet-era Leica cameras (selected from 1.5 million images) and results of the scientific experiments carried out in the film. Essays exploring themes such as the nature of community, power, love, altered states of consciousness and violence intersperse the visual chronological account. The final section catalogues the 80,000 items of period clothing and props as well as the characters who populate the project, where frames from all the footage are presented in chronological order.

In 2018 Comme des Garçons collaborated with DAU project to release an album of photographs as part of their annual initiative of publishing the work of artists and photographers.

In 2018 The DAU Rooms at Le Châtelet special edition was released as ‘a gift to the city of Paris’ containing the works of Bakst, Larionov and Natalia Goncharova next to the fragments of DAU installations with forewords by the Mayor of Paris Anne Hidalgo, Artistic Director of the Châtelet Theater Ruth Mackenzie and others.

Conferences
In 2017 a series of conferences started in London to explore the wide range of cultural, social, and political issues raised in DAU, and continued in Paris at the premiere of the project in 2019.

Complex Installations
The Institute. Complex installations have been an integral part of the project since the Institute functioned during the shooting, creating immersive experiences for visitors and residents.

Berlin. An installation supposed to take place at the planned Berlin premiere of the project in 2018 was cancelled by the city authorities referring to safety and technical issues. The concept was to rebuild a part of the Berlin wall to create ‘a closed-off mini-state, complete with visa checks for visitors’. On this closed territory visitors were to immerse into performances and concerts of artists including Romeo Castellucci, Carsten Höller, Massive Attack and in particular a performance by Marina Abramović and Teodor Currentzis who planned to wash people referring to the procedure in concentration camps where prisoners were taken to gaz cameras, being told that they were going to take shower. The event was supposed to end with a ritual destruction of The Wall with each participant to be offered to carry a piece of the wall with them.

The premiere of the project in Paris also took a form of installation in Théâtre du Châtelet and Théâtre de la Ville that both hosted Serguey Diaghilev’s Russian Seasons a century earlier, as well as in Centre Pompidou, that also provided contemporary art works by Soviet and Russian artists from its collection Kollektsia! to be used as a part of an installation in the theatres. Round-the-clock screenings of the films were accompanied by performances, concerts, installations and conferences; visitors could also visit a canteen, bars, a Soviet shop and have one-to-one sessions with ‘active listeners’.

Dau.Digital
Khrzhanovsky claims the movies are just trailers of what he calls the main product Dau.Digital, an interactive online platform presenting all 700 hours of rushes where a user is navigated by the tags and can structure their own narrative. This format was also presented to the visitors of the Paris premiere.

Babyn Yar
In 2019 Khrzhanovsky accepted the offer made by the Supervisory Board of the Babyn Yar Holocaust Memorial Center (BYHMC) to take up the position of the project’s Artistic Director. The funding of the Memorial Center is carried out on the principle of equal participation of Ukrainian and international donors. As of 2020 the organisation has six donors: three citizens of Ukraine, two citizens with citizenship of the Russian Federation and Israel and one citizen of the USA.
 
In September 2020 on the 79th anniversary of the tragedy in Babyn Yar in the presence of Ukraine’s President Volodymyr Zelenskyy, BYHMC unveiled an audiovisual outdoor memorial installation.

In January 2021 BYHMC presented the creative concept of the memorial that resulted from the work of an international group of authors consisting of architects, historians, museum curators, artists and Holocaust researchers recognised in Ukraine and internationally. Khrzhanovsky leads the general framework of the project.
 
On 14 May 2021, The Day of Remembrance of Ukrainians who rescued Jews during WWII, the memorial unveiled a pop-up synagoge. The inauguration was attended by the Head of the Presidential Office of Ukraine Andrii Yermak, the Prime Minister of Ukraine Denys Shmygal, Ukraine’s Chief Rabbi Moche Reuven Azmann and other state officials, diplomats, religious leaders and cultural and social activists. In October 2021 the project received the international Dezeen architectural award becoming a public vote winner for Cultural Building of the Year.

In July 2021 Ilya Khrzhanovsky with the participation of Marina Abramović presented the final concept of BYHMC and the plans for its development at the All Ukrainian forum ‘Ukraine 30 - Humanitarian Policy’ with Volodymir Zelenskyy announcing the project’s timeframe.
 
On 6 October 2021 in the presence of the presidents of Ukraine, Israel and Germany The Crystal Wall of Crying interactive installation by Marina Abramović, commissioned by BYHMC, was unveiled. The ceremony was accompanied by the Dmitri Shostakovich's Symphony No.13 performed for the first time in Babyn Yar by the German Symphony Orchestra and was linked to the 80th anniversary of the tragedy. 
 
In 2021 Khrzhanovsky produced Sergei Loznitsa's documentary Babi Yar. Context. In July 2021 the movie won the Golden Eye award at Cannes Festival. In November 2021 the documentary was awarded with Golden Centaur Grand Prix at Message to Man International Film Festival.

Social and Political Attitudes
In March 2014 Khrzhanovsky signed the open letter “We are with you!” from the Russian Film Union KinoSoyuz in support of Ukraine, as the reaction to Russian invasion of Crimean Peninsula and since February 2022 has consistently opposed  the Russian invasion of Ukraine.
 
On 24 February 2022 Khrzhanovsky became one of the first signatories of the appeal of directors, writers, journalists, artists, scientists and publishers demanding to ‘end this war’. Subsequently hundreds of Russian citizens have joined the appeal. Initially posted on the Facebook page of Mikhail Zygar; after 4 March 2022 when the ‘fake news law’ entered into force, the text was removed from this page as well as from some other online media.

Also on 24 February 2022 Khrzhanovsky joined the appeal of leading Russian cinematographers issued by The Union of Cinematographers and Professional Cinematographic Organisations and Associations of Russia. 
 
On 3 March 2022 commenting during a live broadcast on Dozhd (Rain) TV channel on a Russian missile strike that hit Babyn Yar, Khrzhanovskiy said ‘the whole of Ukraine has turned into Babi Yar’.  
 
The interview that Volodymir Zelenskyy gave to the Russian journalists on 27 March 2022  was arranged on Khrzhanovskiy’s initiative.

Criticism
Since the Paris premiere of DAU in 2019 Khrzhanovsky's methods have been criticized, in particular from the point of view of engaging and working with non-actors. 
 
In the spring of 2020, Presidential Ombudsman in Children Rights of Ukraine Mykola Kuleba, responding to a Facebook post by Lena Samojlenko from 20 April 2020, appealed to the National Police of Ukraine to launch a probe into alleged ’physical pain or mental suffering through violent actions’ сaused to the children who took part in the shooting of DAU. Thus, the appeal was based on the impression of one single viewer from a movie Dau. Degeneration excerpt. 
 
Khrzhanovsky as well as the officers of the production company denied the accusations referring to the permissions obtained from the orphanage, procedures of infants’ filming that had to be observed and were in place, international distribution certificates that the movie had obtained and the absurdity of assumptions about the reality beyond the frame made after watching a movie excerpt.
 
On 10 July 2020 The Telegraph newspaper issued an apology to Khrzhanovsky for their article published in April about opening a criminal probe, that implied that there were reasonable grounds for such an investigation; in their statement, the newspaper reported that Khrzhanovsky had been paid damages and that he would donate to the Campaign Against Anti-Semitism.
 
In April 2020 a draft presentation of the creative concept of BYHMC was leaked to the press that presented it as a final creative solution. This provoked a scandal; scholars, journalists and writers called for dismissal of Khrzhanovskiy, referring to the assumptions made about DAU project and also pointing out that a Ukrainian memorial can not be controlled by Russian funds. The Head of Scientific Council Karel Berkhoff and the CEO Yana Bariniva left the project as a mark of protest against the approach reflected in the concept. In response, the Memorial Center issued a statement saying: ‘All accusations addressed now to Ilya Khrzanovsky are made based on emotions and subjective thoughts built upon speculations and assumptions’ and called the media and public to ‘be objective and balanced’.
 
On 27 May 2020 The Jerusalem Post published an article by Khrzhanovskiy saying: ‘This interpretation has no connection whatsoever to the artistic spirit that I am striving to embody in the project’. He also stressed that he stayed fully committed to the frame of historical narrative that had been elaborated by scholars and pointed at the difference between methods he had used when working on the DAU arthouse project and those appropriate for dealing with the memory of Babyn Yar tragedy.

At the beginning of 2021 criminal cases were closed as the results of a pre-trial investigation revealed no traces of criminal offence in the actions of the individuals involved in the film production in Kharkiv with the participation of children.

Honors

Stop (1998) (Co-directed with Artyom Mikhalkov)
 Jury Prize, short movie, Primagaz Group Prize, International Film Festival in Saint-Pierre-des-Corps, France (1999)
 Jury Prize, International Film Festival Youth, Kiev, Ukraine (1999) 
 Jury Prize, student/debut feature film, St Anna festival, Moscow, Russia (1999)

4 (2004)
 Tiger Award and the Golden Cactus at The International Film Festival Rotterdam (2005)
 Best Director Prize at the Buenos Aires International Festival of Independent Cinema (2005)
 Grand Jury Prize as Best New Director at the Seattle International Film Festival (2005)
 Best Film and Best Camera Prize at the Transilvania International Film Festival (2005) 
 Best Director Prize at the Athens International Film Festival (2005) 
 Nominated for Fassbinder Prize Film Award (2005)

DAU (2019)
 Selected for European Film Market, Sofia, Bulgaria (2005)
 Selected as one of the 18 best world projects at the Atelier  of the Cannes Film Festival (2006)
 Included in the best 10 projects at International Film Festival CineMart (2006, Rotterdam, Netherlands)
 4th out of 10 best movies of 2019 selected by Film Art magazine 
«Silver Bear» for Outstanding Artistic Contribution at the 70th Berlin International Film Festival to сinematographer Jürgen Jürges(2020). 
Dau. Degeneration - rated 2 in Berlinale critics ratings (2020). 
Dau. Degeneration - rated 1 in the list of the best movies of the first half of 2020 by independent online magazine for film, cinema&TV Film plus Kritik 
DAU. Natasha - Feature Film Selection 2020 by European Film Academy(2020). 
DAU. Natasha. European Film Academy: Natalia Berezhnaya nominated European Actress 2020, (2020).
 Dau. Degeneration: Grand Prix at The Festival of Auteur Cinema in Belgrade  (2020). 
DAU. Natasha - Official Selection at The Seville European Film Festival (2020). 
DAU. Natasha - Official Selection at Palić European Film Festival(2020). 
DAU. Natasha - Official Selection at Riga International Film Festival  (2020).
 Dau. Degeneration - Official Selection at Ostrava Film Festival  (2020). 
 Dau. Degeneration - The Third International Film Award "East – West. The Golden Arch": Best Cinematography, Jürgen Jürges (2021).

References

External links
 Ilya Khrzhanovsky in Seance magazine
 Ilya Khrzhanovsky at Chapaev.Media website 
 "The stark surreal images evoke a mixture of terror and absurdity that comes as close to the experience of an actual nightmare as anything I've seen on the screen", by Stephen Holden, NY Times, 2005.
 "This jaw-dropping whatsit is a grandiose study of barbarism and decay, a treatise on the way of all flesh", by Dennis Lim, 2005
 Ilya Khrzhanovsky's fearless and mesmerizing debut feature, "4", by Robert Abele, Los Angeles Times, 2006
 The Movie Set That Ate Itself by Michael Idov, GQ, 2011
 Apocalypse Dau: the most insane film shoot of all time, and why you may never get to see it, by Adam White, The Telegraph, 2017
 Inside Dau, the 'Stalinist Truman Show': 'I had absolute freedom – until the KGB grabbed me', by Steve Rose, The Guardian, 2019
Apocalypse Dau, by Owen Matthews, The Spectator, 2019
DAU: Strange, Repellent, Mesmerising, Addictive, by Irene Kukota, RUSSIAN ART + CULTURE, 2019
Soviet Time Warp in the Heart of Paris, by Heidi Ellison, 2019 
DAU’s Totalitarian Reality Show: Artwork of the Century or Stalinist Cosplay? By Wilson Tarbox, Frieze, 2019 
DAU Paris 2019: Projet immersif unique signé Ilya Khrzhanovsky, by Caroline J., 2019
DAU. Natasha review, Berlin Film Festival, by Geoffrey Macnab, Independent, 2020
DAU. Degeneration review – shocking, six-hour satire of Soviet science, by Peter Bradshaw, The Guardian, 2020
Inside the Weird World of ‘DAU’: A Soviet Experiment That Became the Most Controversial Film in Years, by Richard Porton, Daily Beast 
The truth about plans for Babyn Yar, by Ilya Khrzhanovsky, 2020
IDFA interview: Ilya Khrzhanovskiy, The Babyn Yar Memorial Centre, on Sergei Loznitsa’s documentary, 2021
"Дау. Дегенерация": насилие над младенцами не подтверждается, дело закрыто, 2021  
«DAU is a process» - A Conversation with Director Ilya Khrzhanovskiy, Apparatus Journal, 2022
How Khrzhanovskiy’s DAU was Tailored. An Interview with Costume Designers, Apparatus Journal, 2022
From Soviet Hairstyles to Contemporary Gender Politics. An Interview with Jekaterina Oertel, Head of Make-up and Hair Design, Participant, Co-Director, and Editor on the DAU Project, Apparatus Journal, 2022
 [​​https://www.apparatusjournal.net/index.php/apparatus/article/view/295 Pearls before Swine. An Interview with Denis Shibanov, the Architect of DAU, Apparatus Journal, 2022]
 Leading Russian producers and directors call for an “immediate end” to invasion of Ukraine, Screendaily
 «Это наш позор». Российские писатели, журналисты и режиссеры призвали остановить войну с Украиной//Meduza
 Regisseur Ilya Khrzhanovsky: "Leider haben die Russen ein sehr kurzes Gedächtnis", Süddeutsche Zeitung, 2022

1975 births
Living people
Russian film directors
Dau (project)
Russian activists against the 2022 Russian invasion of Ukraine